Saddle is a 1993 surrealist sculpture by Irish artist Dorothy Cross. It is in the collection of the Irish Museum of Modern Art having been acquired in 1994. It is created by the combination of found objects - specifically a metal frame, a horse's saddle and an upturned cow's udder. Virgin's Shroud, another work by Cross from 1993, also features cow's udders and is in the collection of the Tate.

References 

Irish contemporary art
Found object